The Sergeant's Daughter is a 1952 West German war romance film directed by George Hurdalek and starring Johanna Matz, Jan Hendriks and Friedrich Domin. It was based on a 1903 novel by Franz Adam Beyerlein which portrayed life in the army of William II.

It was made at the Bavaria Studios in Munich and on location at historic barracks at Ingolstadt. The film's sets were designed by Robert Herlth and Kurt Herlth.

Synopsis
Before the outbreak of the First World War, the daughter of a sergeant in the cavalry falls in love with a junior officer, despite already being engaged to another soldier.

Cast

See also
 Curfew (1925)

References

Bibliography 
 Hans-Michael Bock and Tim Bergfelder. The Concise Cinegraph: An Encyclopedia of German Cinema. Berghahn Books, 2009.

External links 
 

1952 films
1950s war films
German war films
West German films
1950s German-language films
Films directed by George Hurdalek
Films set in the 1910s
Remakes of German films
German black-and-white films
1950s German films